Endorf may refer to:

Endorf, North Rhine-Westphalia
Endorf, Saxony-Anhalt